Sarah Jane Hyland (born November 24, 1990) is an American actress. Born in Manhattan, she attended the Professional Performing Arts School before having small roles in the films Private Parts (1997), Annie (1999) and Blind Date (2007). She is best known for playing Haley Dunphy in the ABC sitcom Modern Family (2009–2020), for which she received much acclaim, including four Screen Actors Guild Awards for Outstanding Performance by an Ensemble in a Comedy Series and a nomination for the Critics' Choice Television Award for Best Supporting Actress in a Comedy Series. In August 2022, Hyland began hosting Love Island USA on Peacock.

Hyland is also known for her roles in the films Geek Charming (2011), Struck by Lightning (2012), Scary Movie 5 (2013), Vampire Academy (2014), See You in Valhalla (2015), XOXO (2016), Dirty Dancing (2017) and The Wedding Year (2019).

Early life and education 
Hyland was born in Manhattan, New York on November 24, 1990. She is the daughter of actors Melissa Canaday and Edward James Hyland, and the sister of actor Ian Hyland.

Hyland attended the Professional Performing Arts School in Manhattan.

Career 
Hyland has been acting since her first role as Howard Stern's daughter in the film Private Parts in 1997. She went on to portray roles such as Molly in the 1999 television film of Annie and Maddie Healy in Lipstick Jungle on NBC. Hyland was featured in an Olive Garden commercial along with actress Molly Culver. She also appeared on Broadway as the young Jacqueline Bouvier in Grey Gardens (2006).

From 2009 to 2020, Hyland played Haley Dunphy on the ABC sitcom Modern Family, for which she and the rest of the show's cast won the Screen Actors Guild Award for Outstanding Performance by an Ensemble in a Comedy Series each year from 2011 through 2014.

In 2011, Hyland co-starred in the Disney Channel Original Movie Geek Charming. In 2012, Hyland appeared in the film Struck by Lightning. In September 2012, she was involved in a Nintendo 3DS ad campaign along with Dianna Agron and Gabby Douglas.

Additional musical projects and theatre productions Hyland has performed in are: Kerrigan-Lowdermilk Live (2013 concert), Hair (2014 adaptation at the Hollywood Bowl), The Unauthorized Musical Parody of Scream (2014 play at Rockwell Table & Stage) and The Kindred Foundation for Adoption created by Jenna Ushkowitz and Samantha Futerman (2015 fundraiser).

In 2014 and 2018, Hyland was a co-host at the Disney Parks Christmas Day Parade (during Disney Parks Frozen Christmas Celebration and The Wonderful World of Disney: Magical Holiday Celebration), which included dancing and singing with Jordan Fisher. Hyland also made a guest appearance during The Wonderful World of Disney: Disneyland 60 (2016) and Mickey's 90th Spectacular (2018).

In 2016, Hyland covered songs with Boyce Avenue such as "Closer" by The Chainsmokers and "Don't Wanna Know" by Maroon 5, both included on the Boyce Avenue album Cover Sessions Vol. 4, which was released on December 19, 2017. "Don't Wanna Know" peaked at No. 62 on the Billboard Canadian Hot 100 chart in December 2016.

In 2019, Hyland partnered with Olay for a skin product campaign. 

Hyland sang her debut performance of "Met At a Party" with Jordan McGraw (son of Dr. Phil) at the 2019 Teen Choice Awards. The single was released on August 9, 2019, via Republic Records.

In December 2020, Hyland appeared in a Taco Bell commercial called "The Craving" with Joe Keery.

In October 2021, she became the new creative director and co-founder of Sourse, a line of chocolate-infused vitamins (including "Beauty Bites" and "Mood Bites").

In August 2022, Hyland began hosting Love Island USA on Peacock. In August 2022, she appeared on America's Got Talent (alongside Sofía Vergara) during the first live Qualifier Results Show of season seventeen, to assist season sixteen winner Dustin Tavella with his magic act.

Hyland starred in Pitch Perfect: Bumper in Berlin, which premiered in November 2022 on Peacock.

Personal life

Relationships 
Hyland dated her Geek Charming co-star Matt Prokop for four years after meeting in 2010. In August 2014, Hyland obtained a domestic violence temporary restraining order against Prokop for physically and verbally abusing her throughout the four years of their relationship. In October of that same year, the restraining order became permanent.

Hyland dated her Shadowhunters and Vampire Academy co-star Dominic Sherwood from 2015 until 2017.

In 2017, Hyland began a relationship with Wells Adams, a radio personality and former contestant on The Bachelorette and Bachelor in Paradise. The couple became engaged in July 2019, In May 2020 they purchased a home in Los Angeles, a month before their planned wedding date. However, the COVID-19 pandemic caused them to postpone their wedding multiple times. An outdoor bridal shower in early June marked the end of their two-year delay, and the couple were finally married at a California vineyard on August 20, 2022. Their intimate wedding was attended by Hyland's Modern Family co-stars.

Health 
Hyland was diagnosed with kidney dysplasia as a young child and received a kidney transplant from her father in April 2012. That kidney failed after a few years, leading to a second kidney transplant in September 2017, donated by her younger brother, Ian. Hyland is on regular anti-rejection medicines and steroids to ensure that her body does not reject her donated kidney; consequently, Hyland has difficulty maintaining weight and muscle mass, and has been put on bed-rest several times, sometimes continuing to film Modern Family simultaneously. Hyland has said that she does not recall shooting some episodes of Modern Family because she was so tired that she slept most of the time she was not shooting her scenes.

In a December 2018 Self magazine article, Hyland said she had contemplated suicide because she felt she was a burden on her family and blamed herself for her body rejecting her father's kidney. Since birth, she has undergone 16 surgeries to improve her health, including numerous kidney surgeries and a laparoscopic surgery to treat her endometriosis.

Filmography

Film

Television

Web

Music videos

Discography

Awards and nominations

References

External links 

 
 
 

1990 births
20th-century American actresses
21st-century American actresses
Actresses from New York City
American child actresses
American film actresses
American musical theatre actresses
American television actresses
American voice actresses
Republic Records artists
Living people
Kidney transplant recipients
People from Manhattan